Hmingthanmawia Ralte (born 31 May 2000), commonly known by his nickname Valpuia, is an Indian professional footballer who plays as a defender for I-League club RoundGlass Punjab, on loan from Indian Super League club Mumbai City.

Career
Born in Aizawl, Mizoram. Hmingthanmawia started playing football at the age of 8. After representing Mizoram in sub juniors, Hmingthanmawia was selected by Aizawl FC junior team. He was the main defender for junior team for two seasons. In September 2017, Hmingthanmawia was promoted to Aizawl F.C. senior team for Mizoram Premier League and I-League.

Career statistics

Club

References

External links 
 ZoFooty Profile

2000 births
Living people
People from Aizawl
Indian footballers
Aizawl FC players
Association football midfielders
Footballers from Mizoram
I-League 2nd Division players
I-League players
Indian Super League players
Mumbai City FC players